Henrik Wigh-Poulsen (born 27 April 1959 in Randers) is a Danish theologian who since September 2015 has been the Bishop of Aarhus.

Life
1979 Community student from Grenå Gymnasium
1989 Theological candidate from Aarhus University
1989-1997 Vicar og Lejrskov-Jordrup parish in the Diocese of Ribe .
1997-1998 High school teacher at Askov High School
1999-2000 Copywriter at advertising agency
2000 PhD Thesis: Nature and Homecoming - a study of Grundtvig and Jakob Knudsen's realism highlighted by the fundamental devil's relationship with *the realistic literature in the years 1870-1890 (Afhandling: Natur og hjemkomst – en undersøgelse af Grundtvigs og Jakob Knudsens realisme belyst *af den grundtvigske bevægelses forhold til den realistiske litteratur i årene 1870-1890)
2000-2008 Editor of Danish Church Press
2000-2008 Head of the Grundtvig Academy, Vartov
2008-2015 The provost of the Odense Cathedral in the Diocese of Funen
2015 till now Bishop of Aarhus

References

1959 births
Living people
21st-century Lutheran bishops
Danish Lutheran bishops
Danish Lutheran theologians
People from Randers